Museum of Ice Cream is a company that develops and operates interactive retail experiences, or "selfie museums", in the United States and Singapore. These exhibits, typically hosted in storefronts, are ice-cream and candy-themed, with bright colors.  The exhibits serve as backdrops for selfies, and the posts made by visitors to Instagram and other social media sites have served to promote the company's offerings.

History
The company was founded by Maryellis Bunn and Manish Vora. Its first location, a pop-up, opened in the Meatpacking District of New York City in 2016. Bunn and Vora initially self-funded the company. Bunn drew inspiration for the company from her perspective on American retail and traditional museums, which she has respectively referred to as a "dead industry" and "archaic". Despite positioning themselves as an alternative to more traditional institutions, the company does not produce "museums" as such; writers have described the locations as "...[playgrounds] with no age [limits]" and as an "interactive multi-sensory exhibit". Bunn has stated she regrets using the term "museum" and now prefers the portmanteau "experiums" to describe the company's offerings.

The success of the first pop-up and subsequent locations inspired the establishment of other experience-focused companies, such as the Museum of Pizza, Cado, and Rosé Mansion. Target began selling pints of Museum of Ice Cream ice cream in 2018. Flavors included "Piñata" and "Sprinkle Pool". As of 2020, Target no longer sells Museum of Ice Cream products. The Museum of Ice Cream also produced a makeup line for Sephora.

The organization received criticism due to its "tone deaf" efforts to express solidarity with protestors after the murder of George Floyd. A sign featuring the names of victims of police brutality, including Trayvon Martin, Eric Garner, and Tamir Rice was placed outside the company's SoHo location in bright pink. Their names were preceded with the words "I scream for..." implicitly comparing the deceased to ice cream. Additionally, Ahmaud Arbery's name was misspelled "Ahmed Aubrey".

In addition, the organization and its founders, Maryellis Bunn and Manish Vora, have been criticized for creating and fostering a hostile work environment. It has also been alleged that workers were denied bathroom breaks during 8-hour shifts

On 7 April 2021, the Singapore Tourism Board announced that Museum of Ice Cream will be opening its first overseas location in Singapore's Dempsey district in August 2021. A total of 14 exclusive installations will be featured. During the official launch on 12 April, details of the exhibits were revealed, including a "Dragon Playground", a jungle with bananas and the largest sprinkle pool of any MOIC. There will also be ice-cream tasting as well. The Museum of Ice Cream opened in Singapore on 19 August 2021.

Locations

See also 
 Color Factory
 Dessert Museum
 Museum of Pizza

References

External links 

2016 establishments in New York City
Visual arts exhibitions